Iscariot most commonly refers to Judas Iscariot, one of the Twelve Apostles best known for betraying Jesus

Iscariot may also refer to:

 Judas Iscariot (band), an American black metal band
 Pisces Iscariot, a compilation album by American alternative rock band The Smashing Pumpkins
 Iscariot (Hellsing), a fictional demon-hunting organization in the anime and manga, Hellsing
 Iscariot, a 2008 Swedish thriller film directed by Miko Lazic